Keshampet is a Mandal in Ranga Reddy district, Telangana , Pincode number 509408.

Institutions
 Zilla Parishad High School
 Hinduja Degree College

Villages
The villages in Keshampeta mandal include:
 Alwal 	
 Bhairkhanpally 	
 Bodanampalle 	
 Chowlapalle 	
 Eklaskhampeta 	
 Ippalapalle 	
 Kakunoor 	
 Keshampet
 Kondareddipalle 	
 Kothapeta 	
 Lemamidi 	
 Lingamdana 	
 Mangalguda
 Nirdavally 	
 Papireddiguda 	
 Pomalpalle 	
 Sangem
 Santhapur 
 Sundarapuram	
 Thommidirekula 	
 Vemulanarva

References

Regional Ring Road regional Ring road

Mandals in Ranga Reddy district